Rhus typhina, the staghorn sumac, is a species of flowering plant in the family Anacardiaceae, native to eastern North America. It is primarily found in southeastern Canada, the northeastern and midwestern United States, and the Appalachian Mountains, but it is widely cultivated as an ornamental throughout the temperate world.

Etymology
The specific epithet typhina is explained in Carl Linnaeus and Ericus Torner's description of the plant with the phrase "Ramis hirtis uti typhi cervini", meaning "the branches are rough like antlers in velvet".

In both French and German, the common name of the species (sumac vinaigrier; Essigbaum) means "vinegar tree".

Description
Leaf petioles and stems are densely covered in rust-colored hairs. The velvety texture and the forking pattern of the branches, reminiscent of antlers, have led to the common name "stag's horn sumac". Staghorn sumac grows as female or male clones.  

Small, greenish-white through yellowish flowers occur in dense terminal panicles, and small, green through reddish drupes occur in dense infructescences. Flowers occur from May through July and fruit ripens from June through September in this species’ native range. Fall foliage is brilliant shades of red, orange and yellow. Fruit can remain on plants from late summer through spring. It is eaten by many birds in winter.

Staghorn sumac spreads by seeds and rhizomes and forms clones often with the older shoots in the center and younger shoots around central older ones. Large clones can grow from ortets in several years.  

Within Anacardiaceae, staghorn sumac is not closely related to poison sumac (Toxicodendron vernix), even though they share the name "sumac".

In late summer some shoots have galls on leaf undersides, caused by the sumac leaf gall aphid, Melaphis rhois. The galls are not markedly harmful to the tree.

Cultivation
Staghorn sumac is an ornamental plant which provides interest throughout the year; though its vigorous, suckering habit makes it unsuitable for smaller gardens. It can grow under a wide array of conditions, but is most often found in dry and poor soil on which other plants cannot survive. Some landscapers remove all but the top branches to create a "crown" effect in order to resemble a small palm tree. Numerous cultivars have been developed for garden use, of which the following have gained the Royal Horticultural Society’s Award of Garden Merit:
Rhus typhina 'Dissecta' (cutleaf staghorn sumac)
Rhus typhina  = 'Sinrus'

Uses

Some beekeepers use dried sumac bobs as a source of fuel for their smokers.

The fruit of sumacs are edible. They can be soaked and washed in cold water, strained, sweetened and made into a pink "lemonade" sometimes called "Indian lemonade". The drink extract can also be used to make jelly. The shoots can be peeled and eaten raw.  The leaves and berries of staghorn sumac have been mixed with tobacco and other herbs and smoked by Native American tribes. This practice continues to a small degree to this day.

All parts of the staghorn sumac, except the roots, can be used as both a natural dye and as a mordant. The plant is rich in tannins and can be added to other dye baths to improve light fastness. The leaves may be harvested in the summer and the bark all year round.

References

External links

Bioimages: Rhus typhina.
 
 Brian Johnston. A Close-up View of the Staghorn Sumac (Rhus typhina). Microscopy—UK.

typhina
Edible fruits
Flora of Eastern Canada
Flora of the Northeastern United States
Flora of the North-Central United States
Flora of the Southeastern United States
Flora of the Appalachian Mountains
Flora of the Great Lakes region (North America)
Flora of Utah
Plants described in 1756
Taxa named by Carl Linnaeus
Plants used in Native American cuisine